Blackfield is a village in Hampshire, England. It is within the parish of Fawley, which is part of the ward of Fawley, Blackfield and Langley.

Schools
The local school is Blackfield Primary (previously divided into Blackfield Infants, and Blackfield Junior Schools). The catchment secondary school for Blackfield is New Forest Academy.

History
The name "Blackfields" was originally applied to an area of countryside near the village of Fawley, and there is still a Blackwell Common next to Blackfield. The name presumably derives from the soil colour, some of which is marshy and black. The settlement of Blackfield began in the late 19th century when, at first mud cottages, and then later, small red-brick houses were built in the area of moorland once known as Hugh's Common. It was close to the small village of Langley.

Sport and leisure
Blackfield has a Non-League football club Blackfield & Langley F.C., which plays at The Gang Warily Community & Recreation Centre.

In 2020, Hampshire County Council announced plans to close the village library.

Notes

External links

Blackfield Primary School website
Hardley School website

Villages in Hampshire